The Top Dutch Joint Solar Array is a 1750-megawatt solar park (350 MW operational, 50 MW under construction, 1350 planned) using over six million solar panels in a total area of  in Groningen, Friesland and Drenthe in the Netherlands.

The Top Dutch Joint Solar Array installations are designed, operated and owned by over 224 partners, including Solarfields, PowerField, Engie, Ecorus, Elize, and many local energy cooperatives.

A total of about 1,750 MW are commissioned as of August 2017, with individual solar parks ranging from hundreds of kW to 300 MW capacity.

The solar parks deliver enough electricity to power the equivalent of approximately 467,000 homes. This is sufficient capacity to deliver clean electricity to 59% all homes in the Top Dutch region.

Environmental benefits 
Preventing more than 708 metric tonnes of carbon dioxide emissions per year – the equivalent of removing over 650,000 cars from the road.

Generating clean electricity to power the equivalent of approximately 467,000 homes.

Three largest photovoltaic power stations worldwide

Three largest photovoltaic power stations in Europe

References

Photovoltaic power stations in the Netherlands
Renewable energy power stations in the Netherlands